Bronllys is a village and community in Powys, Wales between the nearby towns Brecon and Talgarth. Bronllys is also the name of an electoral ward to Powys County Council. The community includes Llyswen.

Description
The village is in the historic county of Brecknockshire (Breconshire). It has recently benefited from a new bypass as part of the Talgarth Relief Road and Bronllys Bypass scheme.

Despite being a small village it has a swimming pool and small leisure centre, post office and hospital.

Bronllys Castle 

Bronllys Castle is a motte and bailey fortress standing south of the village, towards Talgarth.  The castle was founded in or soon after 1100, by Richard Fitz Pons, the owner of the adjacent Herefordshire barony of Clifford, who was a supporter of Bernard of Neufmarché, Lord of Brecknock (in which the land around Bronllys fell). Richard's castle was of the motte-and-bailey design, but only wooden.

In 1521, the year the castle became a crown property, the antiquarian John Leland went to inspect it, reporting that it had fallen into great disrepair; by 1583 the disrepair was substantially worse. It is now in the care of Cadw, the arm of the Welsh Assembly charged with care of historic monuments and is open to the public between April and October.

Bedo Brwynllys 

The minor Welsh bard Bedo Brwynllys lived in Bronllys in the 15th century. His poetry is characteristic of a follower or imitator of Dafydd ap Gwilym and is mainly love poetry or religious poetry and some eulogistic poems such as his elegy for Sir Richard Herbert of Coldbrook, written in 1469.

Governance
An electoral ward in the same name exists. This ward includes Erwood and at the 2011 Census had a total population of 1,282. The ward elects a county councillor to Powys County Council.

References

Remfry, P.M., The Castles of Breconshire [Logaston, 1999]

External links
www.geograph.co.uk : photos of Bronllys and surrounding area

Villages in Powys
Cadw
Castles in Powys
Communities in Powys
Wards of Powys